Mummypowder are a four-piece alternative rock band from Helsinki, Finland. Their frontman and the only remaining original member is the singer, guitar player and songwriter Janne Lehtinen.

History 
Mummypowder were formed in 1996 in Helsinki. They quickly signed a record contract with Straightedge Records in 1997 and subsequently played their tenth concert at New York's famous CBGB's-club, followed by a performance at the Austin, Texas rock festival South by Southwest.

Their debut album, The Heavyweight Champions, was released in 1999 to a great critical acclaim, although sales were moderate. The second album, V. Strange (2003), was written and almost exclusively performed by Janne Lehtinen. Touted one of the albums of the year by some of the press, the album went mostly unnoticed by the audience. Finally in 2004 Mummypowder joined the ranks of Finnish MTV bands with the video of the first single release, Don't Hold Your Breath, from their third album, Consternation! Uproar! (2004).

In May 2006 the album "Consternation! Uproar!" was released in Japan by SuperSonic, which took the band to a small tour in Tokyo.

Mummypowder's fourth album "Centuries Later" was released in May 2011 by Grandpop Records.

Members

Current members 
 Janne Lehtinen – vocals, guitar, songs and lyrics (1996–)
 Aleksi Mänttäri – bass (2001–)
 Staffan Turbanov – guitar (2003–)
 Roope Palomäki – drums (2005–)

Former members 
 Tero Karhu – bass (1996–2001)
 Aleksi Pahkala – guitar (1998–2001)
 Janne Nissilä – drums (1996–2001)
 Heikki Tikka – drums (2001–2005)
 Ville Alajuuma – keyboards (2001–2002)

Discography

Albums 
 The Heavyweight Champions (April 28, 1999)
 V. Strange (May 16, 2003) 
 Consternation! Uproar! (April 23, 2004)
 Consternation! Uproar! (Japan edition) (May 10, 2006)
 Centuries Later (May 11, 2011)

Singles 
 I Think I'm Pregnant-EP (March 14, 1998)
 Blackout-day (June 11, 1999)
 Trying to Ride a Donkey (May 16, 2003)
 Don't Hold Your Breath (February 26, 2004)
 No-one There to Entertain You (September 20, 2004)

Videos 
 Blackout-day (1999)
 Trying to Ride a Donkey (2003)
 Don't Hold Your Breath (2004)

External links 
 Official Mummypowder Website
 Mummypowder Myspace site

Finnish musical groups